This is a list of earthquakes in 1933. Only magnitude 6.0 or greater earthquakes appear on the list. Lower magnitude events are included if they have caused death, injury or damage. Events which occurred in remote areas will be excluded from the list as they wouldn't have generated significant media interest. All dates are listed according to UTC time. The biggest event of the year was the great Japan earthquake which struck early in March. A little over a week later saw southern California's deadliest earthquake to date. China had the deadliest event in August with over 9,300 deaths.

Overall

By death toll 

 Note: At least 10 casualties

By magnitude 

 Note: At least 7.0 magnitude

Notable events

January

February

March

April

May

June

July

August

September

October

November

December

References

1933
 
1933